A list of horror films released in 2011.

References

Lists of horror films by year
2011-related lists